Movement for the Liberation of the Peoples is a political party in Guatemala.

History
The movement was registered on December 8, 2016 in the Supreme Electoral Tribunal and its registration process ends on December 7, 2018. The party's general secretary is Byron Alfredo González Tool. It has more than 23,800 members. It is constituted mainly by members of the Peasant Development Committee (Codeca). Its main leaders have been accused of theft of electric power, as well as multiple demonstrations to demand the resignation of President Jimmy Morales. They have claimed that URNG and Winaq do not represent indigenous peoples. On November 21, 2018, the political organization concluded the requirements and was made official as a political party on the same day.

Election results

President of the Republic of Guatemala

Congress of the Republic

References

2018 establishments in Guatemala
Political parties established in 2018
Indigenist political parties in North America
Socialist parties in Guatemala